Heinz Vroomen (24 November 1918 – 3 October 2003) was a Dutch footballer. He played in one match for the Netherlands national football team in 1940.

References

External links
 

1918 births
2003 deaths
Dutch footballers
Netherlands international footballers
Place of birth missing
Association footballers not categorized by position